This is a list of Ambassadors, High Commissioners, and Permanent Representatives of the Republic of Singapore to other countries and international organisations. Singapore has a total of 27 resident Ambassadors/High Commissioners (some of whom are concurrently accredited to other countries), 4 resident Permanent Representatives, and 39 Non-Resident Ambassadors.

List of Ambassadors

List of High Commissioners
A High Commissioner heads a High Commission, just as an Ambassador heads an Embassy. High Commissioners are therefore also of ambassadorial rank. The term "High Commission" is used to refer to the diplomatic mission of one former British colony - or the United Kingdom - in another (i.e. diplomatic missions within the Commonwealth of Nations).

List of Permanent Representatives
A Permanent Representative heads a diplomatic mission to an international organisation. They are also of ambassadorial rank.

List of Non-Resident Ambassadors, High Commissioners, and Permanent Representatives
In view of Singapore's small population and limited resources, it is not tenable for Singapore to have resident missions in all countries with which it has diplomatic relations. Instead, Singapore appoints Non-Resident Ambassadors (NRAs) or Non-Resident High Commissioners (NRHCs) to certain countries. NRAs/NRHCs are resident in Singapore, but make regular representational visits to their country of accreditation. They are typically non-diplomats, though some are former diplomats. When on representational visits or while performing other official duties, NRAs/NRHCs have the same powers and authority as resident Heads of Mission.

Notes

References

Ambassadors of Singapore
 
Singapore